The lari (ISO 4217: GEL) is the currency of Georgia. It is divided into 100 tetri. The name lari is an old Georgian word denoting a hoard, property, while tetri is an old Georgian monetary term (meaning 'white') used in ancient Colchis from the 6th century BC. Earlier Georgian currencies include the rouble (maneti), abazi, and Georgian coupon or kuponi.

Kuponi 

Georgia replaced the Soviet ruble on 5 April 1993, with the kuponi at par. This currency consisted only of banknotes, had no subdivisions and suffered from hyperinflation. Notes were issued in denominations between 1 and 1 million kuponi, including the somewhat unusual 3, 3000, 30,000 and 150,000 kuponi.

Lari 
On 2 October 1995, the government of Eduard Shevardnadze replaced the provisional coupon currency with the Lari, at a rate of one million to one. It has remained fairly stable since then.

Lari sign 

On 8 July 2014, Giorgi Kadagidze, Governor of the National Bank of Georgia (NBG), introduced the winning proposal for the sign of the national currency to the public and its author. The Georgian lari had its own sign.

The NBG announced the Lari sign competition in December 2013. The temporary commission consisted of representatives of NBG, the Budget and Finance Committee of the Parliament of Georgia, the State Council of Heraldry, the Ministry of Culture and Monument Protection of Georgia and the Ministry of Education and Science of Georgia.

In choosing the winning sign, the commission gave priority to the samples based on the Georgian Mkhedruli character and made a point of the following criteria: conception, design, accordance with Georgian alphabet, existence of elements marking the currency, ease of construction, and observance of requests and recommendations determined by competition rules.

The Lari sign is based on an arched letter ლ (Lasi) of the Georgian script. It is common international practice for a currency sign to consist of a letter, crossed by one or two parallel lines. Two parallel lines crossing the letter Lasi are the basic components of the Lari sign. The so-called “leg” of the letter, represented by a horizontal line, is a necessary attribute of the sign, adding monumental stability to the upper dynamic arc. The form of the letter is transformed in order to simplify its perception and implementation as a Lari sign.

The author of the winning sign is a professional artist-ceramist, Malkhaz Shvelidze.

On 18 July 2014, Giorgi Melashvili, executive director of the National Bank of Georgia, sent a request letter to the Unicode Consortium to register the symbol in the Currency Symbols block of the Unicode Standard as 
 ₾ U+20BE GEORGIAN LARI SIGN

On 17 June 2015, the Unicode Consortium released Unicode V8.0, which includes the Lari sign as

Coins 
Coins are issued in denominations of 1, 2, 5, 10, 20 and 50 tetri, as well as 1 and 2 lari.

Banknotes

2016–2019 (current) series 
Between November 2016 and October 2019 the National Bank of Georgia released five banknotes (in denominations of ₾5, ₾10, ₾20, ₾50, and ₾100), composing a new complete set.

Earlier issues

See also 
 Economy of Georgia (country)
 Larization

References

External links 

 Georgian money, National Bank of Georgia
 Banknotes of Georgia: Georgian Lari Catalog
 
 The banknotes of Georgia 

Currencies of Europe
Economy of Georgia (country)
Currencies introduced in 1995
Currency symbols